"To Agriolouloudo" is one of the best known songs of Stelios Kazantzidis. The lyrics are written by Pythagoras and music is written by Christos Nikolopoulos. The title "To Agriolouloudo" means "The Wild Flower".

Lyrics 

 Don't feel sorry for me,drive me away tonight
 as if I am a wild flower
 and cut my life
 I began nude
 I am heading on all alone
 My house is the street
 and my song is the pain
 Drive me away and don't feel pity for me
 don't be afraid of what will become of me
 even if it snows or if it rains
 the wild flower does remain
 Don't keep me just out of sympathy
 I'm used to the cold I 'll manage the snow (too)
 I began nude
 I am heading on all alone
 My house is the street
 and my song is the pain
 Drive me away and don't feel pity for me
 don't be afraid of what will become of me
 even if it snows or if it rains
 — Singer: Stelios Kazantzidis, Songwriter: Pythagoras, Composer: Christos Nikolopoulos

References

External links
Stelios Kazantzids performs To Agriolouloudo live

Stelios Kazantzidis songs
Greek songs
Year of song missing